Anoka High School is a four-year public high school located in Anoka, Minnesota, United States. It serves grades 9–12 for the Anoka-Hennepin School District 11.

History
The first Anoka High School was opened in 1904 and located in downtown Anoka. The second Anoka High School was opened in 1955, a few blocks southeast of downtown Anoka, with the old location becoming Sandburg Middle School. The current building opened in 1971, and the old high school became Fred Moore Junior High School (later Fred Moore Middle School, and now Anoka Middle School for The Arts). Anoka High School is one of the oldest and one of the largest high schools in the state of Minnesota. From the forming of the Anoka-Hennepin School District 11 in 1920, until the opening of Coon Rapids High School in 1963, all district students attended High School in Anoka.

Athletics
Anoka competes in the Northwest Suburban Conference.

Notable alumni
Michele Bachmann - Former Member of the U.S. House of Representatives
Gretchen Carlson - Fox News anchor and Miss America
Margaret Chutich - Minnesota Supreme Court judge
Jake Deitchler - Olympic wrestler 
Bobby Fenwick - Major League Baseball infielder
Anna Arnold Hedgeman - African-American civil rights leader, politician, educator, and writer
Koryne Horbal - Former chairwoman of the Minnesota Democratic Farmer Labor Party and American Representative to multiple councils at the United Nations
Garrison Keillor - author, host of the radio program "A Prairie Home Companion"
Ben Nelson - Wide Receiver
Steve Nelson - NFL Linebacker
Mark Nenow - Distance runner
Brandon Paulson - Olympic wrestler
Briana Scurry - Courier Six
Abigail Whelan - Member of the Minnesota House of Representatives
Justin Wood - Author and Activist, Founding Member of Back to Zero

References

External links
Anoka High School Homepage

Public high schools in Minnesota
Educational institutions established in 1880
Schools in Anoka County, Minnesota
1880 establishments in Minnesota
Anoka, Minnesota